Lägh da Bitabergh is a lake near Maloja Pass in Val Bregaglia, Grisons, Switzerland.

Access 
The lake can be reached on a hiking trail from Maloja in about 40 minutes hiking time. From Lägh da Bitabergh further hiking trails lead to Lägh da Cavloc (45 minutes) or steeply up to Motta Salacina and Pass dal Caval.

References

Lakes of Switzerland
Lakes of Graubünden
Bregaglia